Daniel Mack Traynor (born 1970) is a United States district judge of the United States District Court for the District of North Dakota.

Education 

Traynor earned his Bachelor of Arts from the University of North Dakota and his Juris Doctor, with distinction, from the University of North Dakota School of Law, where he served as an Associate Editor on the North Dakota Law Review.

Legal career 

Upon graduation from law school, Traynor served as a law clerk to Chief Justice Gerald W. VandeWalle of the North Dakota Supreme Court. From 1998 to 2019, he was a shareholder at the Traynor Law Firm in Devils Lake, North Dakota, where his practice focused on insurance defense, personal injury, and business litigation.

Federal judicial service 

On August 28, 2019, President Donald Trump announced his intent to nominate Traynor to serve as a United States district judge for the United States District Court for the District of North Dakota. On September 19, 2019, his nomination was sent to the Senate. He was nominated to the seat vacated by Judge Daniel L. Hovland, who assumed senior status on November 10, 2019. Traynor was recommended for the district court by Senator Kevin Cramer, who announced his support for the nomination. On September 25, 2019, a hearing on his nomination was held before the Senate Judiciary Committee. On October 31, 2019, his nomination was reported out of committee by a 12–10 vote. On December 18, 2019, the United States Senate invoked cloture on his nomination by a 51–42 vote. On December 19, 2019, his nomination was confirmed by a 51–41 vote. He received his judicial commission on January 13, 2020.

Memberships 

Traynor is a member of the North Dakota State Board of Higher Education and former Chair of the Disciplinary Board of the North Dakota Supreme Court. He has been a member of the Federalist Society since 2016.

References

External links 

1970 births
Living people
20th-century American lawyers
21st-century American judges
21st-century American lawyers
Federalist Society members
Judges of the United States District Court for the District of North Dakota
North Dakota lawyers
North Dakota Republicans
People from Devils Lake, North Dakota
United States district court judges appointed by Donald Trump
University of North Dakota alumni